Prem Prakash Pandey (born 8 March 1958) is an Indian politician who served as 2nd Speaker of the Chhattisgarh Legislative Assembly. He is a member of Bharatiya Janata Party and was Cabinet Minister in Raman Singh's Government. He is one of the architects of Chhattisgarh which was formed in 2000 after the bifurcation of Madhya Pradesh. As a compliment to his efficiency and grasp on the political aspect, he was chosen for the distinguished post of the Speaker of the 2nd Legislative Assembly of Chhattisgarh. He was also a Minister in Government of unpartitioned Madhya Pradesh.

Early life 
Prem Prakash Pandey was born on 8 March 1958 in Bhurwar, Thana-Bankata, District- Deoria, Uttar Pradesh. Mr Pandey hailed from a typical Indian Middle class family. His father was a service holder in Bhilai Steel Plant and mother was a home maker. He was 11 years younger than the Independent India, but was more worried and affected by the growth and political development in India. The gory emergence of Naxalites in the country and in his state had an indelible impact on him. Many other local and national occurrences affected him subconsciously and chiselled him, in later years, to contribute actively in nation-building.

Political life 

Prem Prakash Pandey began his political career in 1976 when he was pursuing education. One major political crisis which triggered his zeal to serve the nation was when India was reeling under the attack on Democracy in the garb of Emergency in 1975. He was imbued especially by Atalji during this phase. His first step into politics was when he decided to join Akhil Bharthi Vidhyarthi Parishad. He took this decision when he was only in Class 11. This very well exemplifies his deep conviction and commitment towards serving public and solving their maladies. In 1976, he officially entered politics in Pandit Ravishankar Shukla University. He gradually moved up the ladder with his grit and determination. In 1990, he won the first election and was entrusted with the charge of Minister of Education, Skill Development and Technical Education in undivided Madhya Pradesh.

In 1993, he became an Elected Member of Legislative Assembly and later in 1995, he was elected as Executive Member of BJP Yuva Morcha. A commendable milestone that he earned was to be elected as the Speaker Of Chhattisgarh Vidhan Sabha, on 22 December 2003.

Initiatives 
He is leaving no stone unturned in unleashing progress and development in Bhilai. His activities are receiving support from the people. He wants the Youth to be empowered, practice positive developmental politics and be a conduit of change. His campaigns such as #BaatBhilaiki were met with fervour by the locals of Bhilai. He is the only Minister in Chhattisgarh to initiate Facebook Live where people beforehand send their queries and their complaints were solved in the aftermath. He has exemplified his visionary attribute through his effort of solving the water woes of his constituency and earned the sobriquet like "Paaniwala Baba". He gave a new identity to Bhilai as he got IIT campus in Bhilai. It was the fruit of his persistent effort that Bhilai has become an educational hub. Akin to this, he is contemplating many other strategies to make Bhilai a smart city as well as a city achieving sustainable growth.

"Swacchata Utsav" 
He also gave vigour to the "Swachh Bharat Abhiyan" campaign in Bhilai to inculcate behavioural change and to keep the environment clean.
Prem Prakash Pandey being the MLA of Bhilai constituency has started (on 28 August 2016) an initiative named "Swacchhata Utsav" under which he visits a part of the constituency every Sunday in the morning with a group of followers and volunteers, where Prem Prakash Pandey and volunteers clean the streets (though symbolically) to spread the message of cleanliness. The idea is to spread the word of "Swachh Bharat Abhiyan" started by nation's prime minister Narendra Modi. It has now become a big 34 weeks long campaign which contributed significantly in improving Bhilai's cleanliness index.

References

External links 
 

People from Bhilai
State cabinet ministers of Chhattisgarh
Living people
1958 births
Speakers of the Chhattisgarh Legislative Assembly
Bharatiya Janata Party politicians from Chhattisgarh
Chhattisgarh MLAs 2003–2008
Chhattisgarh MLAs 2013–2018